Loaded is the fourth studio album by American rock band The Velvet Underground, released in November 1970 by Atlantic Records' subsidiary label Cotillion. Despite having a number of singles originate from it, the album itself failed to chart.

It was the final album recorded featuring founding member and main songwriter Lou Reed, who left shortly before its release. Other founding members Sterling Morrison and Maureen Tucker would leave in 1971. For this reason, it is often considered by fans to be the "last" Velvet Underground album.

It has retrospectively gained positive reception; Loaded was ranked number 110 in 2012, and ranked number 242 in 2020, on Rolling Stones list of the 500 greatest albums of all time.

Background 
Loaded was a commercial effort aimed at radio play, and the album's title refers to Atlantic's request that the band produce an album "loaded with hits", with a double meaning about the word "loaded", that can also mean "full of drugs" or "really high on drugs". Singer/bassist Doug Yule said, "On Loaded there was a big push to produce a hit single, there was that mentality, which one of these is a single, how does it sound when we cut it down to 3.5 minutes, so that was a major topic for the group at that point. And I think that the third album to a great extent shows a lot of that in that a lot of those songs were designed as singles and if you listen to them you can hear the derivation, like this is sort of a Phil Spector-ish kind of song, or this is that type of person song."

Reed was critical of the album's final mix. He left the Velvet Underground on August 23, 1970, but Loaded was not released until November. After its release, Reed maintained in interviews that it had been re-edited and resequenced without his consent.

One of Reed's sore points resulting from that unauthorized re-editing was that the "heavenly wine and roses" section was cut out of "Sweet Jane". In the original recording, this part was intended to provide a perfectly flowing bridge to a full-fledged plagal cadence two-chord version of the chorus (earlier choruses in the song have a 4-chord riff). In Reed's initial solo performances, he would include the verse (see for instance American Poet), until 1973, when he would routinely leave it out, as the bridge fits less well in a more hard rock version (as heard for instance on Rock 'n' Roll Animal). However, the post-Reed, Yule-led band always performed the song with the verse included. A career-spanning retrospective of Reed's recordings with the Velvet Underground and as a solo artist, NYC Man (The Ultimate Collection 1967–2003), which Reed compiled himself, uses the shorter version. When asked about the shortened versions of "Sweet Jane" and "New Age" and Reed's long-standing claims that they were re-edited without his consent, Yule claimed that Reed had in fact edited the songs himself. "He edited it. You have to understand at the time, the motivation was... Lou was, and all of us were, intent on one thing and that was to be successful and what you had to do to be successful in music, was you had to have a hit, and a hit had to be uptempo, short, and with no digressions, straight ahead basically, you wanted a hook and something to feed the hook and that was it. 'Sweet Jane' was arranged just exactly the way it is on the original Loaded release exactly for that reason—to be a hit! 'Who Loves The Sun' was done exactly that way for that reason—to be a hit."

Reed also felt snubbed by being listed third in the credits on the album; and by the large photo of Yule playing piano; and by all the songwriting credits improperly going to the band, rather than Reed himself. Newer releases have satisfied many of Reed's concerns: he is now properly acknowledged as the main songwriter for the album; he is listed at the top of the band line-up and, since the 1995 box set Peel Slowly and See, another mix is available, restoring "Sweet Jane", "Rock & Roll" and "New Age" to the full-length versions Reed had originally penned.

Although she is credited on the sleeve, the album does not feature Velvet Underground stalwart drummer Maureen Tucker, as she was pregnant at the time. Drumming duties were performed mainly by bassist Doug Yule, recording engineer Adrian Barber, session musician Tommy Castanero and Yule's brother Billy. Reed commented that "Loaded didn't have Maureen on it, and that's a lot of people's favorite Velvet Underground record, so we can't get too lost in the mystique of the Velvet Underground... It's still called a Velvet Underground record. But what it really is is something else."

Sterling Morrison had strong feelings about Yule's increased presence on Loaded, saying: "The album came out okay, as far as production it's the best, but it would have been better if it had real good Lou vocals on all the tracks." While Morrison contributed guitar tracks to the album, he was also attending City College of New York and juggling his time between the sessions and classes, leaving most of the creative input to Reed and Yule. Yule claimed that "Lou leaned on me a lot in terms of musical support and vocal arrangements. I did a lot on Loaded. It sort of devolved down to the Lou and Doug recreational recording". Of the ten songs that make up Loaded, Yule's lead vocals were featured on four songs: "Who Loves the Sun", which opens the album, "New Age", "Lonesome Cowboy Bill", and "Oh! Sweet Nuthin'". In addition to his lead vocal parts, Yule handled all of the bass, piano and organ duties, and also recorded several lead guitar tracks. The guitar solos on "Rock and Roll", "Cool it Down", "Head Held High" and "Oh! Sweet Nuthin'" were all played by Yule.

Original copies of the album have no silence in between the first two songs, "Who Loves the Sun" and "Sweet Jane", with the first note of the latter being heard at the precise moment the former completely fades. Some later pressings break the segue with the insertion of a few seconds of silence. All CDs of Loaded retain the original segue without the silence.

The artwork for the album, by Stanislaw Zagorski, features a drawing of the Times Square subway station entrance, with "downtown" misspelled as "dowtown".

Reception and legacy 

Reviewing Loaded in Rolling Stone, Lenny Kaye wrote that "though the Velvet Underground on Loaded are more loose and straightforward than we've yet seen them, there is an undercurrent to the album that makes it more than any mere collection of good-time cuts". In The Village Voice, Robert Christgau said the music was genuinely rock and roll but also "really intellectual and ironic", with Reed's singing embodying the paradox.

According to independent scholar Doyle Greene, Loaded was "straightforward rock and roll" that completely eschewed the avant-garde and experimental music leanings of the Velvet Underground's previous albums, while the songs "Sweet Jane" and "Rock & Roll" distinguished the band as a "seminal proto-punk" act. "The trifecta of 'Who Loves the Sun,' 'Sweet Jane' and 'Rock & Roll' is among the best three-song openings on any rock and roll record", wrote Paste contributor Jeff Gonick. In Routledge's Encyclopedia of Music in the 20th Century (2014), music journalist Michael R. Ross regarded the album as "a near-perfect rock album", while Eric Klinger from PopMatters called it a "great" pop album.

It was voted number 295 in the third edition of Colin Larkin's All Time Top 1000 Albums (2000). In 2003 Loaded was ranked at number 109 on Rolling Stones list of The 500 Greatest Albums of All Time, then was re-ranked at number 110 in the 2012 revision and dropped to number 242 in the 2020 reboot of the list. The album was covered live in its entirety by rock band Phish as one of their "Halloween musical costume" concerts on October 31, 1998.

As of 2013, Loaded has sold 250,000 copies, according to Nielsen Soundscan.

 Track listing 
All songs written by Lou Reed.Note: track lengths listed above are taken from the original LP label and jacket, which also reflect the "Full Length" versions; the original LP actually had shorter versions of certain tracks, but these changes were made after the labels were printed.

 Reissues 
The album was officially released on CD on July 7, 1987, by Warner Special Products. Some of the running times located on the back of the CD case are incorrect. For instance, "Sweet Jane" is marked 3:55 while it is in fact about 3:18; "New Age" is marked 5:20 while it is closer to 4:39.

 Peel Slowly and See 

Loaded was compiled on the fifth disc of the comprehensive, five-year-spanning box set Peel Slowly and See, which was released on September 26, 1995, by Polydor Records. The disc features longer running versions of "Sweet Jane", "Rock & Roll", and "New Age" as well as demos, outtakes and live performances.

 Fully Loaded 
Rhino Records released Fully Loaded, a two-CD reissue of Loaded, on February 18, 1997. It contains numerous alternate takes, alternate mixes, and demo versions of Loaded songs and outtakes, including performances by Maureen Tucker (the outtake "I'm Sticking with You", vocals, and the demo "I Found a Reason", drums). There is also an "orchestral" alternate-take recording of "Ocean" for which the liner notes erroneously credit John Cale on organ. According to a 1995 interview with Doug Yule, who played organ on the recording, the strings used on the track were two cellos and double bass provided by session musicians who followed Yule's musical chart and instructions, and he couldn't recall Cale ever coming to the sessions.

Music journalist David Fricke contributed extensive liner notes to Fully Loaded.

 Loaded: Re-Loaded 45th Anniversary Reissue 
A six-CD reissue of the album released in October 2015.Disc 1 "Who Loves the Sun"
 "Sweet Jane" (Full Length Version)
 "Rock and Roll" (Full Length Version)
 "Cool It Down"
 "New Age" (Full Length Version)
 "Head Held High"
 "Lonesome Cowboy Bill"
 "I Found a Reason"
 "Train Round the Bend"
 "Oh! Sweet Nuthin'"
 "I'm Sticking With You" (Session Outtake)
 "Ocean" (Session Outtake)
 "I Love You" (Session Outtake)
 "Ride into the Sun" (Session Outtake)Disc 2 – Promotional Mono Version "Who Loves the Sun" (Mono)
 "Sweet Jane" (Mono)
 "Rock & Roll" (Mono)
 "Cool It Down" (Mono)
 "New Age" (Mono)
 "Head Held High" (Mono)
 "Lonesome Cowboy Bill" (Mono)
 "I Found a Reason" (Mono)
 "Train Round the Bend" (Mono)
 "Oh! Sweet Nuthin'" (Mono)
 "Who Loves the Sun" (Mono Single Version)
 "Oh! Sweet Nuthin'" (Mono Single Version)
 "Rock & Roll" (Mono Single Version)
 "Lonesome Cowboy Bill" (Mono Unissued Single)Disc 3 – Demos, Early Versions and Alternate Mixes "Rock & Roll" (Demo)
 "Sad Song" (Demo)
 "Satellite of Love" (Demo)
 "Walk and Talk" (Demo)
 "Oh Gin" (Demo)
 "Ocean" (Demo)
 "I Love You" (Demo)
 "Love Makes You Feel Ten Feet Tall" (Demo Remix)
 "I Found a Reason" (Demo)
 "Cool It Down" (Early Version Remix)
 "Sweet Jane" (Early Version Remix)
 "Lonesome Cowboy Bill" (Early Version Remix)
 "Head Held High" (Early Version Remix)
 "Oh! Sweet Nuthin'" (Early Version Remix)
 "Who Loves the Sun" (Alternate Mix)
 "Sweet Jane" (Alternate Mix)
 "Cool It Down" (Alternate Mix)
 "Lonesome Cowboy Bill" (Alternate Mix)
 "Train Round the Bend" (Alternate Mix)
 "Head Held High" (Alternate Mix)
 "Rock & Roll" (Alternate Mix)Disc 4 – Live at Max's Kansas City, August 23, 1970 "I'm Waiting for the Man"
 "White Light White Heat"
 "I'm Set Free"
 "Sweet Jane"
 "Lonesome Cowboy Bill"
 "New Age"
 "Beginning to See The Light"
 "I'll Be Your Mirror"
 "Pale Blue Eyes"
 "Candy Says"
 "Sunday Morning"
 "After Hours"
 "Femme Fatale"
 "Some Kinda Love"
 "Lonesome Cowboy Bill" (Version 2)Disc 5 – Live at Second Fret, Philadelphia, May 9, 1970 "I'm Waiting for the Man"
 "What Goes On"
 "Cool It Down"
 "Sweet Jane"
 "Rock & Roll"
 "Some Kinda Love"
 "New Age"
 "Candy Says"
 "Head Held High"
 "Train Round the Bend"
 "Oh! Sweet Nuthin'"Disc 6 – DVD Audio'''

 "Who Loves the Sun" (5.1 Surround Sound Remix)
 "Sweet Jane" (5.1 Surround Sound Remix)
 "Rock & Roll" (5.1 Surround Sound Remix)
 "Cool It Down" (5.1 Surround Sound Remix)
 "New Age" (5.1 Surround Sound Remix)
 "Lonesome Cowboy Bill" (5.1 Surround Sound Remix)
 "I Found a Reason" (5.1 Surround Sound Remix)
 "Head Held High" (5.1 Surround Sound Remix)
 "Train Round the Bend" (5.1 Surround Sound Remix)
 "Oh! Sweet Nothing" (5.1 Surround Sound Remix)
 "Who Loves the Sun" (5.1 Surround Sound to Stereo Downmixes)
 "Sweet Jane" (5.1 Surround Sound to Stereo Downmixes)
 "Rock & Roll" (5.1 Surround Sound to Stereo Downmixes)
 "Cool It Down" (5.1 Surround Sound to Stereo Downmixes)
 "New Age" (5.1 Surround Sound to Stereo Downmixes)
 "Lonesome Cowboy Bill" (5.1 Surround Sound to Stereo Downmixes)
 "I Found a Reason" (5.1 Surround Sound to Stereo Downmixes)
 "Head Held High" (5.1 Surround Sound to Stereo Downmixes)
 "Train Round the Bend" (5.1 Surround Sound to Stereo Downmixes)
 "Oh! Sweet Nuthin'" (5.1 Surround Sound to Stereo Downmixes)
 "Who Loves The Sun" (Stereo Album)
 "Sweet Jane" (Full Length Version, Stereo Album)
 "Rock & Roll" (Full Length Version, Stereo Album)
 "Cool It Down" (Stereo Album)
 "New Age" (Full Length Version, Stereo Album)
 "Head Held High" (Stereo Album)
 "Lonesome Cowboy Bill" (Stereo Album)
 "I Found a Reason" (Stereo Album)
 "Train Round the Bend" (Stereo Album)
 "Oh! Sweet Nuthin'" (Stereo Album)

 Personnel 
The Velvet Underground
 Lou Reed – vocals, rhythm guitar, piano
 Doug Yule – bass guitar, piano, organ, lead guitar, acoustic guitar, drums, percussion, backing vocals, lead vocals on "Who Loves the Sun", "New Age", "Lonesome Cowboy Bill", "Oh! Sweet Nuthin'", and "Ride Into The Sun (Session Outtake)"
 Sterling Morrison – lead and rhythm guitars, possible backing vocals
 Maureen Tucker – drums: credited, but does not appear due to maternity leave; on the Fully Loaded'' edition, does appear singing on the outtake "I'm Sticking With You" and playing drums on the demo of "I Found a Reason"

Additional musicians
 Adrian Barber – drums on "Who Loves the Sun"
 Tommy Castagnaro – drums on "Cool It Down" and "Head Held High"
 Billy Yule – drums on "Lonesome Cowboy Bill" and "Oh! Sweet Nuthin'"

Technical staff
 Adrian Barber – engineer
 Geoff Haslam, Shel Kagan and the Velvet Underground – producers

Charts

References 

1970 albums
Albums produced by Doug Yule
Albums produced by Lou Reed
Albums produced by Sterling Morrison
Cotillion Records albums
The Velvet Underground albums
Rhino Records albums
Warner Music Group albums
Art rock albums by American artists
Protopunk albums